Antonis Fouasis (born 13 June 1998) is a Greek professional footballer who plays as a left-back for Super League 2 club Panserraikos.

References

1998 births
Living people
Greek footballers
Greece youth international footballers
Super League Greece players
Super League Greece 2 players
Football League (Greece) players
Gamma Ethniki players
Panserraikos F.C. players
Association football fullbacks
People from Syros
Sportspeople from the South Aegean